Mark Seal is an American journalist and author. Seal worked as a journalist in Texas before becoming a freelance magazine writer in 1984, a contributing editor at Vanity Fair since 2003, and has written and co-written about 15 books. Seal's magazine writings have appeared in Esquire, Playboy, Rolling Stone, Condé Nast Traveler, Golf Digest, Texas Monthly, InStyle, Town & Country, Time, and The New York Times. Prior to 1984 when Seal became a freelance magazine writer, he worked as a reporter at several Texas newspapers, including the Houston Chronicle and The Dallas Morning News.

Seal has collaborated on more than 15 non-fiction books, including Alex Spanos's Sharing the Wealth, Bo Derek's Riding Lessons, and Jerry Speziale's Without a Badge: Undercover in the World's Deadliest Criminal Organization. He has written a number of books including Wildflower: An Extraordinary Life and Untimely Death in Africa (2009), a biography of the adventurous life of African wildlife photographer Joan Root. His 2011 book, The Man in the Rockefeller Suit, is about Christian Gerhartsreiter, the serial imposter who posed as a member of the Rockefeller family in what has been described as one of the longest scams in history. The book is in preliminary development to be made into a movie by Fox Searchlight, directed by Walter Salles and produced by Donald De Line.

Bibliography

Books

Essays and reporting
 Oscar Pistorius and Reeva Steenkamp.

See also
Paul Lir Alexander

References

External links
Articles by Mark Seal at Vanity Fair

Living people
American male journalists
The Dallas Morning News people
Houston Chronicle people
Vanity Fair (magazine) people
Year of birth missing (living people)